Grace College is a residential college for tertiary students located on the St Lucia Campus of The University of Queensland. During the Autumn (Semester 1; February to June) and Spring (Semester 2; July to November) semesters of The University of Queensland, the College provides catered accommodation with community development services for its student residents. Outside of these normal operating times, the College is available for short stays and conferences (both catered and non-catered). Short stays may be available during the Academic Year depending on room availability.

Governance 
The College operates under the auspices of the  Uniting Church in Australia (Queensland Synod) and the Presbyterian Church of Queensland.

It is governed by the College Council whose membership is appointed as follows:
 6 members appointed by The Uniting Church in Australia (Queensland Synod) through its Schools' and Residential Colleges' Commission;
 3 members appointed by Assembly of The Presbyterian Church of Queensland; 
 1 member appointed by the Senate of The University of Queensland;
 2 members who are current residents appointed by the Grace College Student Club;
 3 members who are Alumnae and appointed by the Council; and
 the Principal of the College who is a non-voting member.
The key officers (Chairperson, Secretary and Treasurer) of the College Council are incorporated by Letters Patent under the Religious, Educational and Charitable Institutions Act (Qld) 1861-1977.

History 
The College was opened in 1970 as a women's college. In 2022, it became gender inclusive.

Motto 
The motto of the College is "My grace is sufficient" (2 Corinthians 12:9).

Coat of arms
The College coat of arms consists of a purple passion cross fleury (a cross with fleur-de-lis ends on its arms and a lengthened lower arm) on a silver lozenge (diamond-shape) on a red shield.

Mascot 
The mascot of the College is the mythological Phoenix.

Other Relationships 
Through the Grace College Student Club, the College participates in the Inter-College Council formed by the students of the 10 residential colleges on the St Lucia campus of The University of Queensland.

References 

1970 establishments in Australia
Education in Brisbane
Residential colleges of the University of Queensland